Argentina competed at the 2014 Winter Olympics in Sochi, Russia, from 7 to 23 February 2014. A team of seven athletes in two sports competed for the country. Cristian Javier Simari Birkner, an alpine skier, was the flagbearer for the second consecutive games. It also marks the third consecutive games a member of the Simari Birkner family has carried the flag for Argentina.

Competitors

Alpine skiing 

According to the final quota allocation released on 20 January 2014, Argentina had six athletes in qualification position. The non-selection of three-time Olympian María Belén Simari Birkner led to her brother Cristian, who made the team, to lead a petition to have her as a part of the team. They claimed the selection of athletes made no sense and was purely subjective. The appeal was ultimately unsuccessful.

Cross-country skiing 

According to the quota allocation released on 20 January 2014, Argentina had one athlete in qualification position.

Distance

See also
Argentina at the 2014 Summer Youth Olympics
Argentina at the 2014 Winter Paralympics

References

External links 
 
 

Nations at the 2014 Winter Olympics
2014
2014 in Argentine sport